Ashley Heath is a village in Dorset, England adjacent to the villages of St Leonards and St Ives. Together these make up the majority of the St Leonards and St Ives civil parish.

In Braeside Park, St Leonards, there is a youth club next to the village hall and the Scout hut.

It was once served by Ashley Heath Halt railway station on the Southampton and Dorchester Railway the route of which is now known as the Castleman Trailway. Unusually part of one platform, including a station name board, remain.

External links

St Leonards and St Ives Parish Community Website
St Leonards & St Ives Parish Council

Villages in Dorset